The Bellingshausen Sea is an area along the west side of the Antarctic Peninsula between 57°18'W and 102°20'W, west of Alexander Island, east of Cape Flying Fish on Thurston Island, and south of Peter I Island (there the southern Vostokkysten). In the south are, from west to east, Eights Coast, Bryan Coast and English Coast (west part) of West Antarctica. To the west of Cape Flying Fish it joins the Amundsen Sea.

It contains the undersea plain Bellingshausen Plain.

It takes its name from Admiral Thaddeus Bellingshausen, who explored in the area in 1821.

In the late Pliocene Epoch, about 2.15 million years ago, the Eltanin asteroid (about 1-4 km in diameter) impacted at the edge of the Bellingshausen sea (at the South Pacific Ocean). This is the only known impact in a deep-ocean basin in the world.

References

External links
 NASA Bellinghausen Sea satellite photo
 Bellinghausen Sea climatological low pressure system

Seas of the Southern Ocean
Antarctic region